The molecular formula C5H4N4O2 (molar mass: 152.11 g/mol, exact mass: 152.0334 u) may refer to:

 Xanthine, a purine base
 Oxypurinol, an inhibitor of xanthine oxidase

Molecular formulas